Arroyo was a lumber town in western Pennsylvania in the United States that also had an extensive hide tanning industry.

The Arroyo Bridge Company was incorporated in April, 1883, with F. Shaffner, E. M. Rogers, C. H. Smith, James B. Wicks and Charles Millen, directors. The object was to bridge the Clarion at Arroyo.

Arroyo Bridge
The original Arroyo Bridge, located in Elk County, was originally constructed in 1882 by the Arroyo Bridge Company, which consisted of a group of local residents who operated it as a toll bridge until 1899. Elk County purchased the bridge and replaced it in 1901, when it became the site for many summer social events and dances.

This bridge was built to replace the Arroyo Bridge Company's toll bridge. Squire Webster, the toll master, lived at one end of the bridge and collected the tolls from travelers. A family with a horse and wagon could cross for 10 cents. The bridge was such an important structure in the town that dances and parties were held on its deck during Arroyo's heyday. In the early 2000s, the Arroyo Bridge was replaced again.

External links 
 

Populated places in Elk County, Pennsylvania